Groß Twülpstedt is a municipality in the district of Helmstedt, in Lower Saxony, Germany. The Municipality Groß Twülpstedt includes the villages of Groß Sisbeck, Groß Twülpstedt, Klein Sisbeck, Klein Twülpstedt, Papenrode, Rümmer and Volkmarsdorf.

References

Helmstedt (district)